Wafa Assurance is the insurance brand of the Moroccan bank Attijariwafa Bank. It is part of Mohammed VI's holding company SNI.

Key people
Ali Harraj, Chairman of the Board and Chief Executive Officer, Member of the Executive Committee
Slimane Echchihab, Member of the Executive Committee, Co-Chief Executive Officer of Individuals and Professionals Sales
Jean-Charles Freimuller, Member of the Executive Committee, Co-Chief Executive Officer
Abdelmajid Tamim, Member of the Executive Committee, Co-Chief Executive Officer of Enterprise Insurance
Taoufik Benjelloun, Deputy Chief Executive Officer Finance and Member of the Executive Committee
Safaa El Gharbi, Member of the Executive Committee, Deputy Chief Executive Officer of Information Systems and Transformation
Badr Belghiti, Deputy Chief Executive Officer of Individuals and Professionals Insurance, Member of the Executive Committee
Brahim Essaid, General Group Controller
Koudama Zeroual, Director of Marketing and Communication, Member of the Executive Committee
Assia Bouaine, Member of the Executive Committee, Director of Human Resources
Mostafa Bacha, Member of the Executive Committee, Actuary and Reinsurance Director
Marie-Helene Jai, Deputy Director of Group Synergy, Member of the Executive Committee
Naima Jallal, Member of the Executive Committee, Deputy Director of Damages
Michel Albert, Director
Jean-Albert Arvis, Director
Hassan Bouhemou, Director
Omar Bounjou, Director
Mohamed El Kettani, Representative of OGM on the Board
Boubker Jai, Director
Michel Villatte, Director

Source:

Ownership
OGM (Owned by Attijariwafa Bank) 79.29%
Others 17.48%
Wafa Gestion 1.44%
Noureddine ABBAKIL 0.72%
CNIA-Saada 0.66%

Source:

References

External links
company profile at Reuters
 Official website – French language

Financial services companies established in 1972
Insurance companies of Morocco
Société Nationale d'Investissement
ONA Group